Richard Gerold Purcell Jr. (August 6, 1905 – April 10, 1944) was an American actor best known for playing Marvel Comics' Captain America in the 1943 film serial, co-starring with Lorna Gray and Lionel Atwill. Purcell also appeared in films such as Tough Kid (1938), Accidents Will Happen (1938), Heroes in Blue (1939), Irish Luck (1939), The Bank Dick (1940), and King of the Zombies (1941).

Early life
Purcell was born in Greenwich, Connecticut in 1905 (not 1908, as many sources suggest). One of 5 children, he attended Catholic grade school and high school, before enrolling as a student at Fordham University in The Bronx in New York City.

Career
While in New York City, Dick Purcell began his acting career in theatre, appearing in at least three plays: Men in White, Sailor, Beware! and Paths of Glory. During his time acting in Paths of Glory, a talent scout spotted Purcell and this led to a small role in the film Ceiling Zero (1936). His next film was Man Hunt (1936), in which Purcell had a larger role as a newspaper reporter. Purcell appeared in eleven films in 1936 alone.

Captain America serial
Purcell was lucky enough to win the title role in the 1944 Republic serial film Captain America despite being a bit overweight. The story, which was loosely based on the comic book character Captain America, had Captain America, really District Attorney Grant Gardner, trying to thwart the plans of The Scarab, (museum curator Dr. Cyrus Maldor) and his diabolical attempts to acquire a pair of super weapon devices, the "Dynamic Vibrator" and "Electronic Firebolt". 

The serial, which would go on to be box office success, would be Republic's most expensive to make but also its last one about a superhero.

Personal life 
Purcell eloped to Las Vegas with the actress Ethelind Terry. The two married on March 3, 1942, only to divorce on August 26, 1942.

Death
Shortly after he completed the Captain America film serial, and just before its general release, Purcell collapsed in the locker room at a Hollywood country club in Los Angeles on 10 April 1944, shortly after playing a round of golf. His remains were interred at Holy Cross Cemetery, Culver City. According to film historian Raymond Stedman, it was the strain of filming Captain America that was too much for his heart.

Selected filmography

 The Doorway to Hell (1930) - Minor Role (uncredited)
 The Strange Love of Molly Louvain (1932) - Jimmy's College Friend (uncredited)
 Ceiling Zero (1936) - Smiley
 Freshman Love (1936) - Radio Announcer (uncredited)
 Man Hunt (1936) - Skip McHenry
 Brides Are Like That (1936) - Dr. Randolph Jenkins
 Snowed Under (1936) - Bert (uncredited)
 Times Square Playboy (1936) - Wally Calhoun
 The Law in Her Hands (1936) - Marty
 Bullets or Ballots (1936) - Ed Driscoll (credited as Richard Purcell)
 Public Enemy's Wife (1936) - Louie
 Bengal Tiger (1936) - Nick DeLargo
 Jailbreak (1936) - Ed Slayden
 The Case of the Velvet Claws (1936) - Crandal
 The Captain's Kid (1936) - George Chester
 King of Hockey (1936) - Gabby Dugan
 Navy Blues (1937) - Russell J. 'Rusty' Gibbs
 Men in Exile (1937) - Jimmy Carmody
 Melody for Two (1937) - Mel Lynch
 Draegerman Courage (1937) - Trapped Draegerman (uncredited)
 Slim (1937) - Tom
 Public Wedding (1937) - Joe Taylor
 Reported Missing (1937) - Paul Wayne
 Wine, Women and Horses (1937) - George Mayhew
 Alcatraz Island (1937) - 'Harp' Santell
 Missing Witnesses (1937) - 'Bull' Regan
 Daredevil Drivers (1938) - Bill Foster
 Over the Wall (1938) - Ace Scanlon
 Accidents Will Happen (1938) - Jim Faber
 Flight into Nowhere (1938) - 	Bill Kellogg
 Air Devils (1938) - Percy 'Slats' Harrington
 Mystery House (1938) - Lance O'Leary
 Penrod's Double Trouble (1938) - Tex Boyden
 Valley of the Giants (1938) - Creel
 Garden of the Moon (1938) - Rick Fulton
 Broadway Musketeers (1938) - Vincent 'Vince' Morrell
 Nancy Drew... Detective (1938) - Keiffer
 Tough Kid (1938) - 'Red' Murphy
 Blackwell's Island (1939) - Terry Walsh
 Streets of New York (1939) - T.P. 'Tap' Keenan
 Irish Luck (1939) - Steve Lanahan
 Heroes in Blue (1939) - Terry Murphy
 Outside the Three-Mile Limit (1940) - Agent Melvin Pierce
 New Moon (1940) - Alexander
 Private Affairs (1940) - Dick Cartwright
 Arise, My Love (1940) - Pink
 The Bank Dick (1940) - Mackley Q. Greene
 Flight Command (1940) - Lieut. 'Stichy' Payne
 King of the Zombies (1941) - James McCarthy
 Two in a Taxi (1941) - Bill Gratton
 Bullets for O'Hara (1941) - Wicks
 Flying Blind (1941) - Bob Fuller
 The Pittsburgh Kid (1941) - Cliff Halliday
 No Hands on the Clock (1941) - Red Harris
 Torpedo Boat (1942) - Ralph Andrews
 In Old California (1942) - Joe Dawson
 I Live on Danger (1942) - Norm Thompson
 The Old Homestead (1942) - Scarf Lennin
 Phantom Killer (1942) - Edward Arlington Clark
 X Marks the Spot (1942) - Police Lt. William 'Bill' Decker
 Reveille with Beverly (1943) - Andy Adams
 No Place for a Lady (1943) - Rand Brooke
 Idaho (1943) - Duke Springer
 Aerial Gunner (1943) - Pvt. Lancelot 'Gadget' Blaine
 High Explosive (1943) - Dave
 Mystery of the 13th Guest (1943) - Johnny Smith
 Timber Queen (1944) - Milt Holmes
 Captain America (1944, Serial) - Grant Gardner / Captain America
 Trocadero (1944) - Spike Nelson
 Leave It to the Irish (1944) - Pat Burke (final film role)

References

External links

 
 
 Dick Purcell biography
 
 
 
 

1905 births
1944 deaths
Male actors from Greenwich, Connecticut
20th-century American male actors